Deacon Jones (1938–2013) was an American football player.

Deacon Jones may also refer to:
Deacon Jones (infielder) (born 1934), American baseball infielder
Deacon Jones (pitcher) (1892–1952), American baseball pitcher
Deacon Jones (athlete) (1934–2007), American Olympic steeplechase runner
Melvyn "Deacon" Jones also known as Deacon Jones (1943–2017), American blues organist